List of Ministers of Finance of the Republic of the Congo since 1958:

The list of all the former ministers of Finances:

Joseph Vial, 1958-1960
Pierre Goura, 1960-1963
Emmanuel Ebouka Babakas, 1963-1968
Pierre Félicien Nkoua, 1968-1969
Charles-Maurice Sianard, 1969-1970
Boniface Matingou, 1970-1971
Ange Edouard Poungui, 1971-1973
Saturnin Okabe, 1973-1976
Alphonse Souchlaty Poaty, 1976-1983
Henri Lopes, 1983
Justin Lekoundzou, 1983-1989
Edouard Gakosso, 1989-1991
Edouard Ebouka-Babackas, 1991-1992
Clément Mouamba, 1992-1993
, 1993-1997
Luc Daniel Adamo Mateta, 1997
Mathias Dzon, 1997-2002
Rigobert Roger Andely, 2002-2005
Pacifique Issoïbeka, 2005-2009
Gilbert Ondongo, 2009-2016
Calixte Nganongo, 2016-2021
Rigobert Roger Andely, 2021-present

Source:

See also
Economy of the Republic of the Congo

References

Finance ministers of the Republic of the Congo
Ministers of Finance
Foreign Ministers
Politicians
Ministers of Finance